A housing bubble (or a housing price bubble) is one of several types of asset price bubbles which periodically occur in the market. The basic concept of a housing bubble is the same as for other asset bubbles, consisting of two main phases. First there is a period where house prices increase dramatically, driven more and more by speculation. In the second phase, house prices fall dramatically. Housing bubbles tend to be among the asset bubbles with the largest effect on the real economy, because they are credit-fueled, because a large number of households participate and not just investors, and because the wealth effect from housing tends to be larger than for other types of financial assets.

Housing bubble definition 
Most research papers on housing bubbles uses standard asset price definitions. There are many definitions of bubbles. Most of them are normative definitions, like that of Stiglitz (1990), that try to describe bubbles as periods involving speculation, or argue that bubbles involve prices that cannot be justified by fundamentals. Examples are Palgrave (1926), Flood and Hodrick (1990), Shiller (2015), Smith and Smith (2006) and Cochrane (2010).

Stiglitz' definition is: "...the basic intuition is straightforward: if the reason that the price is high today is only because investors believe that the selling price will be high tomorrow—when ‘fundamental' factors do not seem to justify such a price—then a bubble exists." (Stiglitz 1990, p. 13)

Lind (2009) argued that we needed a new definition of price bubbles in the housing market, an "anti-Stiglitz" definition. His point is that traditional definitions such as that of Stiglitz (1990), in which bubbles are proposed as arising from prices not being determined by fundamentals, are problematic. This is primarily because the concept "fundamentals" is vague, but also because these type of nominal definitions typically do not refer to a bubble episode as a whole—with both an increase and a decrease of the price.
Lind claims that the solution is to define a bubble by focusing only on the specific development of prices and not on why prices have developed in a certain way. The general definition of a bubble would then simply be:
"There is a bubble if the (real) price of an asset first increases dramatically over a period of several months or years and then almost immediately falls dramatically." (Lind 2009, p. 80)

Inspired by Lind (2009), Oust and Hrafnkelsson (2017) created the following housing bubble definition: "A large housing price bubble has a dramatic increase in real prices, at least 50% during a five-year period or 35% during a three-year period, followed by an immediate dramatic fall in the prices of at least 35%. A small bubble has a dramatic increase in real prices, at least 35% during a five-year period or 20% during a three-year period, followed by an immediate dramatic fall in the prices of at least 20%."

Identifying housing bubbles

Housing bubbles vs. overpricing in the housing market 

Overpricing can be said to be a necessary, but insufficient indicator that a bubble exists. Overpricing is defined more widely than a bubble. An asset may be overpriced without there being a bubble, but you cannot have a (positive) bubble without overpricing. Over- or underpricing may simply be defined as a deviation from the equilibrium price. DiPasquale and Wheaton (1994) say that:
"Indeed, it appears to be normal for housing prices to deviate from the fundamental value or equilibrium price, since housing markets clear gradually rather than quickly in a short run."

Mayer (2011) investigated house price bubbles and found that there are basically three approaches researchers take when investigating house price differ from equilibrium. 

First, there is the finance-based method, where the house price equals the discounted future rents. This follows the same logic when performing a stock valuation; the stock price is equal to the discounted sum of all future dividends. The idea is that the value of equity is equal to the discounted dividends. Price rent ratio and user cost of housing are methods that fall under this method. 

The second approach is to compare the costs of building new dwellings against the actual house prices today. Much of the construction cost method has its basis in the demand and supply curve theory. If demand is low, this leads to lower house prices and less construction of new homes. Glaeser and Gyourko (2005) point out that the housing market is characterized by a kinked supply curve that is highly elastic when prices are at or above construction costs. Otherwise, the supply curve is highly inelastic. Housing can be built rather quickly, but since housing is a durable good, old housing does not disappear quickly. Thus, house prices in slow or negative demand growth markets are capped by construction costs. Price construction cost ratio and price building cost ratio are methods that is falls in under this method. 

The last approach by Mayer (2011) is to utilize a combination of house price affordability to derive an equilibrium model. Often house prices are compared to income (income is used as proxy variable for affordability). If house prices are too high, households cannot afford the same level of housing services (affordability). Symmetrically, when house prices are low, households may afford a higher level of housing services. Price income ratio, price wage ratio, price household income ratio are examples of this method. There also exist a set of different affordability measures and indexes that looks at the development in interest payments to income or the cost of the mortgage to income.
In addition to using house price equilibrium based on economic measures, there are also possible to use statistical techniques to identifying the long-term price trend, for example HP-filter.

Shiller's bubble checklist (2010) 
Sharp increases in the price of an asset like real estate or shares
Great public excitement about said increases
An accompanying media frenzy
Stories of people earning much money, causing envy among people who are not
Growing interest in asset class among the general public
"New era" theories to justify unprecedented price increases
A decline in lending standards

Lind's housing bubble indicator groups (2009) 
Interest payments in relation to income for homebuyers
Nominal interest payments in relation to income have been increasing.
Nominal interest payment in relation to income would have been increasing if historical interest rate levels were applied.
Real interest payments in relation to income have been increasing.
Real interest payments in relation to income would have been increasing if historical interest rate levels were applied.
Housing supply
The easier it is to increase supply, the more likely is the increased price a part of a bubble
Buyer expectations about prices
Buyers expect prices to continue to rise or to stabilize on a level that is much higher than historical trends.
Buyers believe that even in a median term perspective (three to five years) investing in housing is almost risk‐free.
Buyers risk‐taking and impatience
People are entering ownership at an earlier age or at a higher quality level.
Buyers tend to choose riskier financing alternatives than earlier.
Buyers are amortizing less than earlier.
Bank behavior
Banks are increasing or at least not decreasing loan to value ratios for buyers on the housing market when prices increase.
Banks become more liberal when judging the credit worthiness of households.
Speculative behavior
A larger share of home‐buyers than usual are planning to sell rather quickly again.

Other housing bubble indicators 
Housing prices vs. vacancy rate. A large number of vacancies will have a downward pressure on prices, since in this case; supply exceeds demand (Geltner, Miller, Clayton, & Eichholtz, 2007). Alternatively the opposite: occupancy rate. 
Real housing prices vs. demography. If there is a net inflow of tenants the cost of dwelling can be expected to increase (Englund, 2011).
Housing prices vs. GDP can be used if data on income is unavailable, since changes in GDP and income can be expected to correlate (Claussen, Jonsson, & Lagerwall, 2011).
The loan to value ratio (LTV) is a good indicator for the risk involved for the lender as well as for the borrower. The higher the ratio the higher is the risk (Kokko, 1999). 
The debt service ratio or debt coverage ratio (DSCR), i.e. the ratio of funds available for the payment of interest and principal. This is considered a good indicator for the level of risk involved (Joshi, 2006).
The ratio between loan and disposable income should not change over time. An increase above the long term average indicates that the market may be overvalued (Finocchinaro, Nilsson, Nyberg, & Soultanaeva, 2011).
Housing prices vs. interest rates. If interest rates increase it will be more expensive to own a piece of real estate and to compensate for the higher user cost it can be expected that the price will drop. (Englund, 2011).
High and increasing house price growth. Oust and Hrafnkelsson (2017)

Historical housing bubbles

Large housing bubbles in OECD counties 1970–2015 

The table is from Oust and Hrafnkelsson (2017) and has been constructed using their bubble definition. The dataset consists of quarterly real prices for 20 OECD countries from 1970 to 2015. Duration is the number of quarters since the last turning point (or from the start of the data series). Aggregated price change is the aggregate price change for the duration. *The aggregated price change is from the start of the period to the peak.

Small housing bubbles in OECD countries 1970–2015 
	 	 	 	 

The table is from Oust and Hrafnkelsson (2017) and has been constructed using their bubble definition. The dataset consists of quarterly real prices for 20 OECD countries from 1970–2015. Duration is the number of quarters since the last turning point (or from the start of the data series). Aggregated price change is the aggregate price change for the duration. * The aggregated price change is from the start of the period to the peak.

See also
 Real estate bubble
For individual countries, see:
 Australian property bubble – ongoing currently
 Russian residential real estate 2020–2022 bubble — ongoing  currently.
 Baltic states housing bubble
 British property bubble
 Bulgarian property bubble
 Canadian property bubble - ongoing currently
 Chinese property bubble – 2005–2011
 Danish property bubble – 2001–2006
 Irish property bubble – 1999–2006
 Japanese asset price bubble – 1986–1991
 Lebanese housing bubble
 New Zealand property bubble – ongoing currently
 Polish property bubble – 2002–2008
 Romanian property bubble
 Spanish property bubble – 1985–2008
 United States housing bubble – 1997–2006

References

 
Economic inequality